The Guardian Building is a landmark skyscraper in the United States, located at 500 Griswold Street in Downtown Detroit, Michigan, within the Financial District. The Guardian is a class-A office building owned by Wayne County, Michigan and serves as its headquarters. Built in 1928 and finished in 1929, the building was originally called the Union Trust Building and is a bold example of Art Deco architecture, including art moderne designs. At the top of the Guardian Building's spire is a large U.S. flag, complementing the four smaller flags atop nearby 150 West Jefferson. The building has undergone recent award-winning renovations. It was designated a National Historic Landmark on June 29, 1989, and the associated Detroit Financial District is on the National Register of Historic Places. The Guardian building includes retail and a tourist gift shop.

Architecture

The main frame of the skyscraper rises 36 stories, capped by two asymmetric spires, one extending for four additional stories. The roof height of the building is 496 ft (151 m), the top floor is 489 feet (149 m), and the spire reaches 632 ft (192.6 m). Its nickname, Cathedral of Finance, alludes both to the building's resemblance to a cathedral—with its tower over the main entrance and octagonal apse at the opposite end—and to New York City's Woolworth Building, which had earlier been dubbed the Cathedral of Commerce. Native American themes are common inside and outside the building. Wirt C. Rowland, of the Smith, Hinchman & Grylls firm, was the building's architect. The building rises from a granite and stone six story base with two Corrado Parducci created sculptures flanking the Griswold Street entrance. The exterior blends brickwork with tile, limestone, and terra cotta. Rowland's attention to detail was meticulous. He supervised the creation of the colored brick cladding to achieve the desired color for the exterior. Afterward, the brick was marketed by the manufacturer as "Union Trust Brick" and after 1939, as Guardian brick". Rowland designed furniture for the bank's offices and his attention went as far as designing tableware, linens and waitress uniforms for a restaurant in the building.

The building's three story, vaulted lobby is lavishly decorated with Pewabic and Rookwood tile. The semi-circular exterior domes are filled with Pewabic Pottery; Mary Chase Perry Stratton worked closely with the architect in the design of the symbolic decorations. (See Savage, infra.)  A Monel metal screen divides the lobby from the banking hall on the second floor, the screen features a clock in the center designed by Tiffany. The building includes works by muralist Ezra Winter in the mosaic above the main lobby desk and the mural at the end of the banking hall. The large mosaic is of a pine tree and text that states the Union Trust Company's purpose for the building, "Founded on principles of faith and understating, this building is erected for the purpose of continuing and maintaining the ideals of financial services which promoted the organization of the institution". The mural highlights Michigan's industries such as manufacturing, farming and mining. In order to dampen the sound in the banking hall, its cement-plaster ceiling features a hand-painted canvas ceiling, which was stretched over a mat of horsehair.

Innovations

The Guardian Building featured innovations in both design and technology. The building's designer, Wirt Rowland, specified Monel metal in place of the commonly used brass and bronze for all exposed metalwork on the building, an innovation which was widely adopted, most notably on New York's Chrysler Building. Rowland dispensed with traditional forms of decoration, using instead colored materials (brick, stone, and terra cotta) set in geometric patterns on both the interior and exterior of the structure. The building's elevator system represented the first use of technology which automatically stopped the car level with the floor and opened the doors, tasks formerly handled by the operator.

William Edward Kapp, architect for the firm of Smith, Hinchman & Grylls has been credited with interior design work on the Guardian Building.

History
The skyscraper was built by the Union Trust Company, founded in Detroit in 1890 by Senator James McMillan, and Dexter M. Ferry, along with investments from Russell A. Alger, Col. Frank J. Hecker, and Christian H. Buhl. During World War II, the Guardian Building served as the U.S. Army Command Center for war time production. The Guardian served various tenants as an office building in downtown Detroit. In 1982 it became the headquarters of Michigan Consolidated Gas Company ("MichCon") subsequent to the divestiture of MichCon by ANR Company in 1981. Under the leadership of President and COO Stephen E. Ewing, MichCon restored the lobby and vaulted ceilings on the first floor in 1986.  It would stay MichCon's later to be called MCN Energy Group headquarters until the merger of MCN with DTE Energy in 2001. It was sold by DTE to a local real estate developer, the Sterling Group, in 2002.

The Sterling Group invested $14 million in the building and reopened the lobby to the public, which had only been accessible to employees after MichCon purchased the building.
 
On July 18, 2007, Wayne County Executive Robert Ficano announced it has entered into an agreement to purchase the Guardian Building to relocate its offices from the Wayne County Building. The deal was reportedly part of a larger deal worth $33.5 million in real estate purchases in downtown Detroit. The Guardian Building has become a souvenir item along with other Detroit skyscrapers.

Tenants
SmithGroupJJR
Wayne County - Departments: Buildings, Commission, Corporation Counsel, Department of Information Technology, Economic Development Corporation, Management & Budget, County Executive, Healthchoice, Health, Veterans Services, Prosecutors & Detectives, Personal/Workforce.
Detroit Land Bank Authority,
Guardian Cafe,
Pure Detroit,
Bank of America,
Huron Capital,
Detroit Economic Growth Corporation,
Downtown Realty,
Eagle Security Services,
Federal Criminal Attorneys of Michigan,
Law Office of Ben Gonek & Joel Sklar,
Law Office of Jeffrey Edison,
Jacobs & Diemer,
Roncelli Construction Services,
Attorney Kenneth Sebree,
Wade Trim,
WSP, 
Bajoka Law Group,
Guardian Store,
Green Room,
Crazy Gringo,
Land Capital Ventures,
Law Office of Maria Mannarino,
Neighborhood Defender Services,
Steingold Law Firm,

Gallery

See also

 Buhl Building
 Cadillac Place
 David Stott Building
 Fisher Building
 Penobscot Building
 List of tallest buildings in Detroit

References

Further reading
Ferry, W. Hawkins (1968). The Buildings of Detroit: A History. Wayne State University Press.
Kvaran, Einar Einarsson, Shadowing Parducci, unpublished manuscript, Detroit.

Lacy, Robert, Ford, The Men and the Machine, Little Brown & Co., 1986, pgs. 328-334

External links
www.guardianbuilding.com 

 Official Guardian Building website
 
 National Park Service: Guardian Building
 
Made in Michigan Blog: "Cathedral of Finance" (Guardian Building) — text and vintage images.
 

Art Deco skyscrapers
Downtown Detroit
County government buildings in Michigan
Skyscraper office buildings in Detroit
Office buildings completed in 1929
National Historic Landmarks in Metro Detroit
National Register of Historic Places in Detroit
Government buildings on the National Register of Historic Places in Michigan
Historic district contributing properties in Michigan
1920s architecture in the United States
1928 sculptures
Outdoor sculptures in Michigan
Buildings with sculpture by Corrado Parducci
Art Deco architecture in Michigan
Mayan Revival architecture